Granosolarium is a genus of snail. It was named by Federico Sacco in 1892.

Name
Granosolarium Sacco, 1892

Synonyms
 Claraxis Iredale, 1936
 Heliacus (Claraxis) Iredale, 1936
 Solariaxis Dall, 1892

Species
Granosolarium asperum (Hinds, 1844)
Granosolarium elegantissimum (Kuroda & Habe in Habe, 1961)
Granosolarium excavatum Bieler, 1993
Granosolarium gemmiferum Bieler, 1993
Granosolarium mirabile (Schepman, 1909)

References

External links 

Architectonicidae
Taxa named by Federico Sacco